Dreams of Breathing Underwater is a 2008 album by folk singer and violin player Eliza Carthy. It is seen by many as a successor to her 2000 album Angels and Cigarettes.

Track listing 
All tracks written by Eliza Carthy and Ben Ivitsky except "Hug You Like a Mountain" (Rory McLeod)

 "Follow the Dollar" – 3:40
 "Two Tears" – 4:14
 "Rows of Angels" – 3:12
 "Rosalie" – 3:43
 "Mr Magnifico" – 6:06
 "Like I Care (Wings)" – 3:28
 "Lavenders" – 4:19
 "Little Bigman" – 4:58
 "Simple Things" – 4:22
 "Hug You Like a Mountain" – 4:30
 "Oranges and Sea Salt" – 3:34

Song details 
 "Mr. Magnifico" is said to frequent the Holyrood Tavern in Edinburgh.

Personnel 
 Eliza Carthy – tenor guitar, singing, violin, octave violin, ukulele, one row melodeon, piano
 Barnaby Stradling – bass guitar
 Willy Molleson – drums, singing, drumtrak machine, vocals, cajon/moog
 Ben Ivitsky – singing, 5-string viola, acoustic and electric guitars, noises, Stylaphone, triangle, percussion, rowing, cajon/moog, trombone, vocals
 Barney Strachan – organetta, singing, drumtrak machine
 John Spiers – melodeon, singing
 Jon Boden – violin, concertina, singing, banjo
 Conrad Ivitsky – double bass, vocals
 Donald Hay – drums, percussion
 Heather Macleod – singing
 Paul Sartin – oboe
 Micky Marr – bass guitar
 Robert McFall – string arrangement, violin
 Claire Sterling – violin
 Brian Schieles – viola
 Su-a Lee – cello
 Tom Lyne – double bass
 Tim Mathew – narrator (on "Mr Magnifico"), violin
 Toby Shippey – trumpet
 Martin Green – piano accordion, keyboards
 Marcus Britton – trumpet
 Tim Lane – trombone
 Olivia Furness – tenor saxophone
 Greg Ivitsky – alto saxophone, vocals
 Sarah Roberts – singing
 Eddi Reader – singing
 Emma Smith – singing
 Gideon Jukes – tuba
 David "Demus" Donnelly – bass guitar
 The Bevvy Sisters – Heather Macleod, Kaela Rowan, Lindsay Black.

References 

2008 albums
Eliza Carthy albums
Topic Records albums